Montana Academy (Founded in 1997) is  a small coeducational therapeutic boarding school in Marion, Montana with behavioral modification and academic programs. The school is for students age 14-19 (high school) and enrollment is generally around 30 students. They claim to combine clinicians, a therapeutic program, and a challenging prep school. In 2019, Montana Academy came under scrutiny due to a student death and was profiled as part of a media investigation into the lack of oversight at Montana boarding schools.

Location 
Montana Academy is located in Lost Prairie, about forty-five minutes west of Kalispell.

See also 

 List of high schools in Montana

References

External links
 Montana Academy

Therapeutic community
Private high schools in Montana
Boarding schools in Montana
Therapeutic boarding schools in the United States
Buildings and structures in Flathead County, Montana
Education in Flathead County, Montana